El Perchel is an underground station serving Lines 1 and 2 of the Málaga Metro. The station opened on 30 July 2014 as the city centre terminus for both lines.

Services

Currently, El Perchel is a terminus station, and the only station serving both lines of the metro. Line 1 reaches Andalucia Tech, while Line 2 ends at Palacio de Deportes José María Martín Carpena. Entrances to El Perchel are located outside Málaga María Zambrano railway station, where AVE high-speed rail services, regional trains and local Cercanías trains to Fuengirola and Álora can be accessed.

Future
El Perchel is to become a through-station, as an extension further into the city centre with two underground stops, Guadalmedina and Atarazanas, is under construction and due to open in 2022.

References

Metro stations in Spain
2014 establishments in Andalusia
Buildings and structures in Málaga
Railway stations in Spain opened in 2014